The 1997 Survivor Series was the 11th annual Survivor Series professional wrestling pay-per-view (PPV) event produced by the World Wrestling Federation (WWF, now WWE). It was presented by Milton Bradley's Karate Fighters. The event took place on November 9, 1997, at the Molson Centre in Montreal, Quebec, Canada. The tagline "Gang Rulz" refers to the various wrestling stables that feuded with each other heading into this event. Seven matches were contested on the event's card.

The main event was a standard wrestling match for the WWF Championship, in which Bret Hart defended the title against Shawn Michaels. It was the last of three WWF Championship matches between the two, who had previously headlined the 1992 Survivor Series and WrestleMania XII together. Michaels won the title in controversial fashion when Vince McMahon ordered match referee Earl Hebner to end the match as Michaels held Hart in Hart's own finishing maneuver, the Sharpshooter, even though Hart had not submitted. This incident became known as the Montreal Screwjob and marked Hart's last appearance on WWE programming until 2006. This was also the last time that Hart held a title in WWE until May 2010, and the last time he headlined a WWE pay-per-view until SummerSlam 2010. According to WWE, the Montreal Screwjob, which took place at the end of the last match on the card, is considered the beginning of the Attitude Era. A video package aired immediately before the Hart vs. Michaels match, featuring the first use of the "WWF Attitude" scratch logo.

The undercard featured Stone Cold Steve Austin versus Owen Hart in a standard wrestling match for the WWF Intercontinental Championship, Kane versus Mankind, and four 4-on-4 elimination tag team matches.

Production

Background
Survivor Series is an annual gimmick pay-per-view (PPV), produced every November by the World Wrestling Federation (WWF, now WWE) since 1987. In what has become the second longest running pay-per-view event in history (behind WWE's WrestleMania), it is one of the promotion's original four pay-per-views, along with WrestleMania, SummerSlam, and Survivor Series, and was considered one of the "Big Five" PPVs, along with King of the Ring. The event is traditionally characterized by having Survivor Series matches, which are tag team elimination matches that typically pits teams of four or five wrestlers against each other. The 1997 event was the 11th event in the Survivor Series chronology and was scheduled to be held on November 9, 1997, at the Molson Centre in Montreal, Quebec, Canada.

Storylines
Survivor Series consisted of professional wrestling matches involving wrestlers from pre-existing feuds and storylines that played out on Raw is War — WWF's primary television program. Wrestlers portrayed a hero or a villain as they followed a series of events that built tension, and culminated in a wrestling match or series of matches.

The Storyline feud between Bret Hart and Shawn Michaels began after Michaels became the number one contender to the WWF Championship by defeating The Undertaker in the first Hell in a Cell match at Badd Blood: In Your House. On the following nights episode of Raw is War, while Michaels, alongside his friend Hunter Hearst Helmsley were blurting out insults to Vince McMahon by the announce table, Hart alongside members of The Hart Foundation appeared with Hart calling Michaels nothing more than a degenerate before challenging Triple H to a match later that night. Hart later lost to Helmsley by count out after Michaels hit him with Sweet Chin Music while he was blocking an attack by Helmsley's bodyguard Chyna.

Event
In the first match, Road Dogg, Billy Gunn and The Godwinns (Survivors: Dogg and Gunn) won in 15:26, after Gunn hit a top rope leg drop.

In the second match, The Truth Commission (Sole Survivor: The Interrogator) won in 9:56, after Interrogator defeated Crush.

In the third match, Team Canada (Sole Survivor: British Bulldog) won in 17:47, after Bulldog hit Vader with the ring bell.

In the fourth match, Kane won in 9:29, after hitting Mankind with a tombstone piledriver.

In the fifth match, Ahmed Johnson, Ken Shamrock and LOD (Sole Survivor: Ken Shamrock) won in 20:33, after Shamrock made Rocky Maivia tap out to the Ankle Lock.

In the sixth match, Steve Austin won in 4:02 and became the new WWF Intercontinental Champion, after hitting Owen Hart with the stunner.

Immediately after the Steve Austin vs. Owen Hart match and before the Bret Hart vs. Shawn Michaels match, a video package was aired featuring promos from Ahmed Johnson, The Undertaker, Bret Hart, Faarooq, Steve Austin and Shawn Michaels discussing their athletic backgrounds and injuries suffered, ending with Bret Hart saying "Try lacing my boots," and finally with the first use of the "WWF Attitude" scratch logo displayed on the screen. In later re-airings of the video package, Hart's tagline was replaced by Austin (also saying "Try lacing my boots").

In the main event, Shawn Michaels won in 12:19 and became the new WWF Champion, after Michaels locked Bret Hart into the sharpshooter. Even though Hart had not submitted, Michaels was declared the winner, as Earl Hebner, on direct orders from McMahon, called for the bell.

Reception
In 2015, Kevin Pantoja of 411Mania gave the event a rating of 6.0 [Average], stating, "Shortly after the WWE Network launched, I watched this show and disliked it. Looking at it now, it’s pretty good. The Survivor Series matches, except for the DOA one, are all relatively fun. It also gets the score bumped up a bit more due to the historical value here. The main event, while not classic, kind of has to be seen by any and every wrestling fan."

Aftermath 
The controversial ending surrounding Shawn Michaels defeating Bret Hart by submission and winning the WWF Championship due to Vince McMahon ordering the referee Earl Hebner to ring the bell without Hart submitting became known as the Montreal Screwjob. Hart left the World Wrestling Federation (WWF) immediately after the incident and moved to World Championship Wrestling (WCW), where he became a two-time WCW World Heavyweight Champion, a four-time WCW United States Heavyweight Champion and one half of the WCW World Tag Team Champions before retiring in 2000 after a severe concussion. Hart next appeared in the WWF (now known as World Wrestling Entertainment or WWE) in 2010 when he and Michaels called a truce and buried the hatchet on the Montreal Screwjob, having been inducted to the WWE Hall of Fame four years prior.

After Survivor Series, Shawn Michaels began his third reign as WWF Champion. He entered a feud with Ken Shamrock over the WWF Championship which culminated at D-Generation X: In Your House where Michaels retained the title after Shamrock won by disqualification after being attacked by D-Generation X (DX) members Triple H and Chyna. Michaels lost the WWF Championship to Stone Cold Steve Austin at WrestleMania XIV before a four-year hiatus after a back injury during a casket match against The Undertaker at the 1998 Royal Rumble. He returned at SummerSlam 2002.

After winning the Intercontinental Championship, Stone Cold Steve Austin entered into a feud with The Rock over the title after The Rock stole Austin's title belt after a beat down from The Nation of Domination on the November 17 episode of Raw is War. Austin retained the Intercontinental Championship and regained the belt by defeating The Rock at D-Generation X: In Your House. Austin forfeited the title to The Rock the next night on Raw is War with the sole intention of going after the WWF Championship before hitting The Rock with a Stone Cold Stunner.

Vince McMahon's actions of screwing Bret Hart from the WWF Championship marked the beginning of the Mr. McMahon character, the tyrannical CEO of WWF. In 1998, McMahon began a legendary rivalry with Stone Cold Steve Austin.

The events of the Montreal Screwjob repeated at the following year's Survivor Series, albeit worked, when The Rock locked Mankind in the Sharpshooter before Mr. McMahon ordered the referee to call for the bell, "screwing" Mankind and awarding the then-vacant WWF Championship to The Rock.

Results

Survivor Series elimination matches

Other on-screen personnel

See also

Professional wrestling in Canada

References

Sources

hoffco-inc.com - Survivor Series '97 review (Archived)
1997 Survivor Series Results

External links
Official 1997 Survivor Series site

Professional wrestling shows in Montreal
1997
1997 in Quebec
1997 WWF pay-per-view events
November 1997 events in Canada
WWE in Canada